Moffat Takadiwa (b. 1983) is a Zimbabwean contemporary visual artist.

Background 
Moffat Takadiwa was born in Tengwe, in the north-western district of Hurungwe where he grew up. He then relocated to the city of Harare, where he is known as the 'spiritual garbage man' because of his installations and sculptures he creates from waste products. Takadiwa also briefly lived in South Africa. It is where he has forged alliances and collaborations that increasingly inform his artistic practice. He addresses material culture, spirituality and the environment. He has recently reformed a former community beerhall that was abandoned in recent years into a thriving art precinct in the historical township of Mbare. The space is named Mbare Art Space, here he has built his own studio, but also invites other artists to work in community with him.

Art career 
Takadiwa started showing his work professionally in 2008, and was soon part of a group of artists that started First Floor Gallery in Harare, which is now an important independent gallery. He has since moved away from the project. Takadiwa, whose work is community oriented, now works from Mbare Art Space a repurposed beerhall. Having found a unique register to build his work, Takadiwa, is now one of the most global contemporary Zimbabwean artists. His work is shown in various venues from Los Angeles to Johannesburg; Harare to Tokyo and many places in between. Takadiwa also trained at the Harare Polytechnic where he graduated with a BA Honors in Fine Art. One of his pieces is currently in the collection of Jay Z.

Selected solo exhibitions 
2018 – Framed in Colonial Lenses, Raw Spot Gallery, Rhodes University

2017 – Say Hello to English, Tyburn Gallery, London

2016 – Across Borders, Whatiftheworld, Cape Town

2015 – Foreign Objects, Tyburn Gallery, London

2012 – Africa not reachable, First Floor Gallery, Harare

References 

Living people
Zimbabwean artists
1983 births